Richard Trexler (1932 – 8 March 2007) was a professor of History at Binghamton University, State University of New York.  A specialist of the Renaissance, Reformation of Italy, and Behaviorist History, Trexler had over fifty published works. He was best known for revolutionizing the field of public life as historically significant. To celebrate his career and retirement, Binghamton University on April 14, 2004, had a symposium in his honor where renowned scholars in Early Modern Europe spoke on his behalf.

Trexler retired from the faculty of Binghamton University a year before his death. His final course was a history of Child Abuse in Europe and the United States, offered in the spring of 2006.

Publications
The Journey of the Magi. Meanings in History of a Christian Story (Princeton: Princeton University Press, 1997). 
Sex and Conquest: Gender Construction and Political Order at the Time of the European Conquest of the Americas (Polity Press and Cornell University Press, 1995). 
Dependence in Context In Renaissance Florence (Binghamton, NY: Medieval & Renaissance Texts & Studies, 1994). 
Power & Dependence in Renaissance Florence, vol. I (The Women...), II (The Children...), III (The Workers of Renaissance Florence) (Binghamton: MRTS, 1993). 
Public Life in Renaissance Florence, Studies in Social Discontinuity (Academic Press, 1980. Reprinted: Cornell University Press, 1991). 
Naked Before the Father. The Renunciation of Francis of Assisi (Peter Lang, 1989). 
 "Historiography Sacred or Profane? Reverence and Profanity in the Study of Early Modern Religion," in Religion and Society in Early Modern Europe, 1500-1800, ed. K. von Greyerz (London, 1984), 243-269.
 Trexler RC (2003) Reliving Golgotha: the passion play of Iztapalapa. Cambridge, MA: Harvard University Press

References

External links
 

Binghamton University faculty
State University of New York faculty
1932 births
2007 deaths
20th-century American historians
American male non-fiction writers
Historians of Italy
20th-century American male writers